Nadège Douroux (born 23 May 1981) is a French yacht racer who competed in the 2004 Summer Olympics.

References

External links 
 

1981 births
Living people
French female sailors (sport)
Olympic sailors of France
Sailors at the 2004 Summer Olympics – 470
21st-century French women